Pseudorthonychiidae is an extinct, monogeneric (contains only one genus) family of fossil snails, gastropod mollusks in the clade Cycloneritimorpha (according to the taxonomy of the Gastropoda by Bouchet & Rocroi, 2005).

Genera
The sole genus in this family is:
 Pseudorthonychia  Bandel & Frýda, 1999

References 

 Paleobiology database entry
K. Bandel and J. Frýda. 1999. Notes on the evolution and higher classification of the subclass Neritimorpha (Gastropoda) with the description of some new taxa. Geologica et Palaeontologica 33(2):219-235